Thief of Damascus  is a 1952 American Technicolor adventure film directed by Will Jason and starring Paul Henreid. The film features a generous use of stock footage from such films as Joan of Arc. The film, produced by Sam Katzman, was preceded by his The Magic Carpet and followed by Siren of Bagdad.

Plot
634 A.D.:Though General Amdar is able to win the Siege of Damascus for his ruler Khalid, he is made an enemy of the State. Amdar escapes and steals a scimitar made of Damascus steel.  He leads an alliance of Sinbad without his ship, Aladdin without his lamp, Sheherazade, and Ali Baba and his 40 thieves to depose Khalid and win the heart of Princess Zafir.

Cast
As appearing in screen credits (main roles identified):

References

External links
 
 
 
 

1952 films
1952 adventure films
Films directed by John Rawlins
American adventure films
Films based on One Thousand and One Nights
Columbia Pictures films
Films set in Damascus
Films directed by Will Jason
1950s English-language films
1950s American films